Veroli Basket was an Italian professional basketball team based in Veroli, Lazio. It ceased operations in February 2015 after financial problems.

History
After taking part in Centro Sportivo Italiano (a Christian sports association) competitions, the club was officially created as società Basket Veroli in 1968. The club was promoted to the national Serie C in 1974-75.
In 2002-03 it moved up to the Serie B1, the third division, at the end of the 2006-07 season the side was promoted to the LegaDue.
 
The club would win the 2009 LegaDue Cup, and the next two editions as well.

After suffering from financial problems and being unable to pay its players, Veroli withdrew from the Serie A2 Gold (the renamed second division) in February 2015, later ceasing activities.

Notable players
 Jarrius Jackson 2 seasons: '10-'12
 Kyle Hines 2 seasons: '08-'10
 Afik Nissim 2 seasons: '08-'10

Notable coaches
  Andrea Trinchieri 1 season: '08-'09
  Fernando Gentile 1 season: '11-'12

References

External links 
 Eurobasket.com profile

1968 establishments in Italy
2015 disestablishments in Italy
Basketball teams established in 1968
Basketball teams in Lazio
Defunct basketball teams in Italy
Basketball teams disestablished in 2015